Bram Nuytinck (born 4 May 1990) is a Dutch professional footballer who plays as a centre-back for  club Sampdoria.

Club career

Early career
Born in Heumen, Gelderland, Nuytinck started playing football as an 8-year old for amateur club Juliana '31. In 2001, he was picked up by NEC, and joined their youth teams.

NEC
In spring 2009, Nuytinck became a part of the first team of NEC, where Mario Been was head coach. He signed a two-year contract with the club.

On 23 December 2009, Nuytinck made his first team debut under new coach Wiljan Vloet in the cup match against FC Groningen. He was substituted in the 53d minute, and came onto the pitch for Patrick Pothuizen. His first match in the starting lineup was on 30 January 2010 against Sparta Rotterdam. Two weeks later, on 12 February 2010, Nuytinck scored twice against NAC Breda, helping his team to win 4–2.

In January 2011, Nuytinck rejected an offer from Spanish club Osasuna, in order to keep developing as a player in NEC. In the spring of 2012, Napoli, Juventus, Ajax and Everton showed interest in Nuytinck who had grown into a profile in the Dutch Eredivisie and captained the Dutch under-21 team.

Anderlecht
On 31 August 2012, Nuytinck signed with Anderlecht. He made his debut in the UEFA Champions League for Anderlecht. During his first two years in the club he grew into a regular, winning the Belgian First Division A both years. After his coach, fellow Dutchman John van den Brom, was sacked in 2014, Nuytinck saw himself play less as Olivier Deschacht was preferred in the centre of defense. The following year, during the 2016–17 season, Nuytinck was a regular in the starting lineup again, as Anderlecht finished first in the league.

Udinese
On 29 July 2017, Nuytinck signed for Italian team Udinese on a four-year contract. On 27 August, in his second appearance for the club, he scored his first goal in the Serie A in a 3–2 loss at SPAL.

On 26 September 2018, Nuytinck scored with a bicycle kick in a 2–1 loss to Lazio.

Nuytinck made 143 appearances for Udinese through six seasons, in which he scored three goals and assisted four.

Sampdoria
Nuytinck joined Sampdoria on a free transfer on 2 January 2023, signing a six-month contract.

Career statistics

Club

Honours
Anderlecht
 Belgian Pro League: 2012–13, 2013–14, 2016–17
 Belgian Super Cup: 2013, 2014

References

External links

Voetbal International profile
Netherlands stats at OnsOranje

1990 births
Living people
People from Heumen
Dutch footballers
Footballers from Gelderland
Association football defenders
Netherlands under-21 international footballers
Eredivisie players
Belgian Pro League players
Serie A players
Juliana '31 players
NEC Nijmegen players
R.S.C. Anderlecht players
Udinese Calcio players
U.C. Sampdoria players
Dutch expatriate footballers
Dutch expatriate sportspeople in Belgium
Expatriate footballers in Belgium
Dutch expatriate sportspeople in Italy
Expatriate footballers in Italy